Kyenjojo District is a district in the Western Region of Uganda. Kyenjojo town is the site of the district headquarters.

Location
Kyenjojo District is bordered by Kibale District to the north, Kyegegwa District to the east, Kamwenge District to the south, and Kabarole District to the west. The coordinates of the district are 00 37N, 30 37E.

Overview
Kyenjojo District was created in 2000. It is divided into two counties: Mwenge North and Mwenge South. Kyenjojo means: "the place where elephants live"; it is derived from the Rutooro word "enjojo", (elephant)(s). Like in most Ugandan Bantu languages, "Mwenge" means "banana beer", which is produced there.

The district is part of Toro sub-region, which is coterminal with the Kingdom of Toro, one of the ancient traditional monarchies in Uganda.

Population
The 1991 national census estimated the district population at about 182,000. The next national census, in 2002, estimated the population at 266,250. In 2012, the population was estimated at 383,600.

Economic activities
Agriculture is the main economic activity in the district. The major crops grown include:

References

External links
The Evolution of Ugandan Districts
Kyenjonjo District: Home of Elephants, Chimps

 
Districts of Uganda
Western Region, Uganda
Toro sub-region